Felsőtárkány National Forest Railway is a 5 kilometers long railway line in Northern Hungary. It operates regularly between 1 May and 30 September. It was built in 1915.

Stations 
Village of Felsőtárkány
Egres Valley (Varróház)
Stimecz-ház Tourist House and Field School

Sights around 
Vöröskő spring
A 1,5 km long hiking trail with 21 stops.
Lake of Felsőtárkány
Museum of Bükk

Railway lines in Hungary
Forestry in Hungary
760 mm gauge railways in Hungary